Amit Das (born 2 March 1992) is an Indian cricketer who plays for Odisha. He made his first-class debut on 7 November 2015 in the 2015–16 Ranji Trophy.

References

External links
 

1992 births
Living people
Indian cricketers
Odisha cricketers
People from Rourkela
Cricketers from Odisha